Nathalie Dechy and Dinara Safina were the defending champions, but Safina chose not to participate, and only Dechy competed that year.
Dechy partnered with Casey Dellacqua, but lost in the first round to Klaudia Jans and Alicja Rosolska.

Cara Black and Liezel Huber won in the final 6–3, 7–6(8–6), against Lisa Raymond and Samantha Stosur.

Seeds

Draw

Finals

Top half

Section 1

Section 2

Bottom half

Section 3

Section 4

External links
Draws
2008 US Open – Women's draws and results at the International Tennis Federation

Women's Doubles
US Open (tennis) by year – Women's doubles
2008 in women's tennis
2008 in American women's sports